Château de Dax was a castle in Dax, Nouvelle-Aquitaine in southwestern France.

History
The castle was once the home of Viscounts of Dax. The castle was captured by the French in 1442 and also in 1451 during the Gascon campaign of 1450-1453 to expel the English from the Duchy of Gascony. Decommissioned as a military barracks in 1888, the castle was demolished in 1891.

References
Ducourneau, Alexandre. La Guienne Historique et Monumentale Tome 1 seconde partie. 1842. (French)

Châteaux in Landes (department)
Demolished buildings and structures in France
Buildings and structures demolished in 1891